The Lancashire and Yorkshire Railway Class5 were 2-4-2T steam locomotives designed by Chief Mechanical Engineer (CME) John Aspinall and introduced from 1889 for local passenger work.  Later batches included progressive modifications such as extended coal bunkers and belpaire fireboxes.  The final batch built from 1911 to 1914 under George Hughes incorporating superheated boilers and belpaire firebox gave increased tractive effort, others were also rebuilt to this standard. When Hughes introduced his classification system in 1919, the more powerful superheated locomotives were designated Class6.  The final examples were withdrawn in 1961.

Development

Aspinall
John Aspinall was from the Great Southern and Western Railway (GS&WR) of Ireland, and had succeeded Barton Wright in 1886 with the goal of continuing Wright's policy of standardisation on a minimum number of locomotive classes. Aspinall built more of slightly modified versions of Wright's 0-6-0 and 4-4-0 designs but was concerned with some aspects of the 0-4-4T design used for local passenger duties. Aspinall disliked unguided leading wheels as they could give rise to excessive flange wear and rough riding though neither the L&YR 0-4-4Ts nor the GS&WR's 0-4-4BTs had given problems. Having determined on a larger 2-4-2T design he reviewed best practice from contemporary designs including Webb's LNWR 4ft 6in Tank Class, proposed 4ft 6in 2-4-2Ts and Worsdell's 2-4-2T. The design incorporated Joy valve gear and Webb's radial axle box.

The design emerged on as 20 February 1889 and was the first locomotive built at Horwich Works. The original coal bunker capacity was of 2 tons. 270 were built in total.

In 1895 after noting current practice elsewhere, Aspinall switched to using balanced Richardson slide valves in lieu of the ordinary slide valves that the 1887 experiments of the GS&WR's Robert Coey had endorsed in 1887. The reported feedback results were reduced wear, very slight decrease in coal consumption, freer running, and stronger running.

The total length increased to  while the wheelbase remained unchanged. All subsequent builds were to use long frames.

Hoy and Druitt Halpin experiments 
Hoy had been Works Manager at Horwich since 12 April 1887, and on Aspinall's appointment to L&YR General Manager on 1 June 1899 Hoy was promoted to CME.

One locomotive, 632, was rebuilt by Hoy in 1902 with an experimental Druitt Halpin thermal storage apparatus. Similar in some respects to a Flaman boiler, this resembled a second short boiler drum atop the normal drum, in place of the dome. Other locomotives: 1015, 1164, 1315, 1335 & 1375 were similarly fitted in 1905. Henry Ivatt also experimented with a similar device on a GNR 2-4-0. Neither appears to have been successful and after problems with mud and scale build-up, Hughes had them removed.

Hughes

Hughes was promoted to CME from Works Manager on 10 February 1904.  From 1905 in lots 51 and 64 he built 40 additional 2-4-2T locomotives with a Belpaire firebox replacing the original round-topped boiler.  Predominately in the first half of the 1910s, this non-superheated boiler was also fitted to a number of rebuilt locomotives.

Class 6 
Bulleid in his book "The Aspinall Era" notes Horwich had fully mastered superheating by 1911.

Other superheated locomotives also arose from conversions.  There were eventually 44 conversions, 26 were of the Aspinall engines (which gained a Belpaire firebox at the same time), 18 of Hughes' own version with Belpaire firebox.

When Hughes introduced his classification system around 1919, the more powerful superheated locomotives were designated Class6, non superheated locomotives being Class5.

The locomotives passed to the London, Midland and Scottish Railway (LMS) in 1923. LMS numbers were 10900–10954, except for 9 which were converted after the grouping without being renumbered.

Horwich Lot 1 comprised 10 locomotives; the rest 20 each.

Miscellaneous
The set of short-bunkered  frames were used to create a LY&R electric locomotive in 1912.

Service 
Bulleid claims the radial tanks made at excellent start to service life, with No. 1008 going from the works and into service with no teething troubles in February 1889. Their duties also included the steepest passenger line in England, 127 for  the Werneth spur.

In 1903, the incumbent CME Henry Hoy reported that the now 270 strong class had between them covered  in the preceding 14 years all over the L&YR system. They had suitable ability on passenger duties to haul a considerable load at any reasonable speed.

The last batch of 2-4-2 radial tanks entered service in 1911 and these more moreful superheated L&YR Class 6 were allocated to run some express passenger services to some extent as the unrebuilt Hughes 4-6-0 had multiple problems and the Aspinall Atlantics were beginning to exhibit high levels of unserviceability.  However the L&YR were severely censured by the Boarad of Trade in the 1912 Charlestown curve derailment inquiry report for use of large  radial tanks on high speed passenger services but despite protestations reputational damage seems to have resulted and the practice somewhat discontinued.

On 1 January 1922, the LY&R amalgamated with the London and North Western Railway (LWNR) and the fleet passed on into the London, Midland and Scottish Railway (LMS) with the initial grouping on 1 January 1923.

Some of the locomotives were fitted for push-pull working, being coupled to a driving trailer coach that contained a driver's cab and allowing the train to be driven in reverse, without running the locomotive around the train at the terminus. The engines fitted for push-pull servie can easily be recognised by looking at the front or rear. Standard fittings are; a steam pipe hanging under the buffer beam to the left of the coupling and a vacuum brake stand pipe rising from the buffer beam to the right of the coupling. Push-pull fitted engines have an additional throttle vacuum riser pipe to the left of the coupling. 

During the period under the LMS nearly two-thirds of the type were withdrawn and about 109 or 110 2Ps survived to pass to the nationalised British Railways on 1 January 1948.  They were joined by 14 of the superheated Class 6 that were renumbered in the range 50835–50953, and which were all scrapped by 1952.   By 1961 only three remained in existence.

Wirral Railway 
The Wirral Railway (WR) acquired one of these locomotives from the L&YR in June 1921: No. 1041 became WR No. 6. After the Grouping of 1923, this re-joined its original stablemates as part of the newly created London, Midland and Scottish Railway. Although the L&YR locomotives were numbered in a block from No. 10621 upwards, which included the allocation of No. 10638 to the original L&YR number of the Wirral locomotive, the former Wirral locomotive stock was included in the LMS Western Division. The largest constituent of the Western Division was the LNWR, and so WR No. 6 was numbered 6762 by the LMS, at the end of a block starting at 6515 which was allocated to former LNWR 2-4-2T locomotives; this locomotive followed on from nos. 6758–61, four former LNWR 4ft 6in Tank Class which the WR had acquired from the LNWR.

No. 6762 survived into British Railways ownership (as 46762) and worked as station pilot at Preston, until being withdrawn and scrapped in 1952. It was the only Wirral Railway engine to last until Nationalisation; it also retained the original round-topped boiler throughout.

Incidents

1903 Waterloo Merseyside derailment 
On 15 July 1903, a Liverpool to Southport express with a six bogie carriage hauled by a 2-4-2T tank built in 1899 derailed on the approach to  station resulting seven fatalities including the fireman and injury to 112 passengers, the driver, and three other companies staff.

1906 boiler explosion 
The firebox crown sheet broke free of its rod stays and burst downwards, although without splitting. 57 of the 150 one-inch (25-mm) rod stays failed, the steam escaping through the remaining holes scalding the driver, although both footplate crew survived their injuries. The cause of the accident, which was the L&YR's second major boiler explosion in five years, was put down to poor washing out of the firebox water spaces when at  shed. Afterwards,  of boiler scale was collected. Although boilers were supposed to be washed out every eight days, this quantity suggests that it was up to three weeks since this had last been done thoroughly, either through omission or by inadequate washing.

1912 Charlestown curve derailment
On 21 June 1912, the 2:25 pm Manchester to Leeds express hauled by superheated 2-4-2T suffered a serious derailment on Charlestown curve between Todmorden and Sowerby Bridge. In the Board of Trade report, Lieut–Col. E. Druitt criticised the L&YR for using tank locomotives on express trains.

1916 viaduct collapse

The driver and fireman had time to run clear, but the locomotive fell  into the valley below. Recovery intact was not possible, and the locomotive was scrapped in situ over the following three weeks. The pieces were hauled up the embankment, loaded into wagons and sent back to Horwich, where some of the parts were incorporated into a replacement locomotive bearing the same number. No. 661 was one of those built with long frames, but the only available set of spare frames were of the short variety, so these were lengthened by welding on extension pieces at the rear.

Preservation 
A single preserved example of the type exists. No. 1008, the first Class 5 engine to be built, was withdrawn in 1954 after sixty-five years of service, and is now preserved as a static exhibit in the National Railway Museum. This locomotive is the small bunkered version with the round topped boiler.

Models and miniatures 
The Wildlife Express Train at Walt Disney World Florida uses 3 engines modelled on the LY&R 2-4-2T on a 3 ft width narrow gauge.  Bachmann introduced a ready to run OO gauge short frame round top boilered model of the LY&R 2-4-2T radial tank in the early 2010s, before that there had only been a few kits available from various sources.

Notes

References

Bibliography 

 

 

2-4-2T locomotives
05
Railway locomotives introduced in 1889
Standard gauge steam locomotives of Great Britain
1′B1′ n2t locomotives
Passenger locomotives